The 2012 Ontario Scotties Tournament of Hearts, Ontario's women's provincial curling championship, was held from January 23 to 29 at the Kenora Curling Club in Kenora, Ontario. The winning team of Tracy Horgan represented Ontario at the 2012 Scotties Tournament of Hearts in Red Deer, Alberta, where they finished with a 4-7 record.

Qualification Process
Ten teams qualified for the provincial tournament through several methods. Four teams qualified from Northern Ontario, two teams qualified from Regions 1&2, two teams qualified from regions 3&4 and two teams qualified from the Challenge Round.

Teams

Standings

Results

Draw 1
January 23, 7:00 PM CT

Draw 2
January 24, 2:00 PM CT

Draw 3
January 24, 7:00 PM CT

Draw 4
January 25, 2:00 PM CT

Draw 5
January 25, 7:00 PM CT

Draw 6
January 26, 2:00 PM CT

Draw 7
January 26, 7:00 PM CT

Draw 8
January 27, 2:00 PM CT

Draw 9
January 27, 7:00 PM CT

Playoffs

1 vs. 2
January 28, 2:00 PM CT

3 vs. 4
January 28, 7:00 PM CT

Semifinal
January 29, 9:30 AM CT

Final
January 29, 2:00 PM CT

Qualification
Southern Ontario zones run from December 9 to 11, 2011, and December 16 to 19, 2011. Two teams from each zone qualify to two regional tournaments, and two teams from each of the two tournaments qualify to the provincials. Two additional teams qualify out of a second chance qualifier.

The Northern Ontario provincial championship were held from December 8 to 11 at the Copper Cliff Curling Club in Copper Cliff, Ontario. Four teams qualified out of the Northern Ontario championship.

Regional Qualifiers In Bold

Southern Ontario Zone Qualification

Zone 1
December 10–11 at the RCMP Curling Club, Ottawa

 Jenn Hanna (Ottawa Curling)
 Rachel Homan (Ottawa Curling)
 Jennifer Harvey (Cornwall)

Zone 2
December 9–11 at the RCMP Curling Club, Ottawa

 Tracy Samaan (Rideau)
 Christine McCrady (Rideau)
 Lauren Mann (Rideau)
 Laura Payne (Rideau)
 Marla Weinberger (Rideau)

Zone 3
December 9–11 at the Pakenham Curling Club, Pakenham

As there were no teams entered in this zone, seeds 3A and 3B will be filled by seeds from Zone 7.

Zone 4
December 16–18 at the Brighton & District Curling Club, Brighton

 Lisa Farnell (Loonie)

As there was only one team entered in this zone, Farnell will be seeded as seed 4A, and seed 4B will be filled by a seed from Zone 7.

Zone 5
December 17–18 at the Beaverton Curling Club, Beaverton

 Julie O'Neill (Lindsay)
 Jaimee Gardner (Peterborough C.C.)
 Angie Melaney (Lakefield)

Zone 6
December 10–12 at the Sutton Curling Club, Sutton West

 Susan McKnight (Uxbridge)
 Lesley Pyne (Annandale)

Zone 7
December 17–18 at the Bayview Golf & Country Club, Thornhill

 Kirsten Wall (Donalda)
 Julie Hastings (Bayview)
 Shawnessy Johnson (East York) (Zone 3A Qualifier)
 Colleen Madonia (Thornhill) (Zone 3B Qualifier)
Christine Anderson (Leaside) (Zone 4B Qualifier)
 Joanne Heffernan (Bayview)
 Danielle Bourque (Leaside)
 Jan Carwardine (Leaside)

Zone 8
December 17–18 at the Oakville Curling Club, Oakville

 Cathy Auld (Mississaugua)
 Ashley Waye (Royals)
 Kelly Cochrane (High Park)

Zone 9
December 10–11 at the King Curling Club, Schomberg

 Kathy Brown (King)
 Kristy Russell (Shelburne)
 Meagan Tervail (Brampton)
 Julie Reddick (King)
 Alison Goring (Milton)

Zone 10
December 10–11 at the Barrie Curling Club, Barrie

 Sherry Middaugh (Coldwater)
 Heather Marshall (Orillia)
 Sarah Picton (Stroud) (Zone 11B Qualifier)
 Lynne Middaugh (Orillia)
 Kristeen Wilson (Midland)
 Julie Truscott (Parry Sound)

Zone 11
December 16–18 at the Blue Water Curling Club, Owen Sound

 Leslie Bishop (Port Elgin)

As there was only one team entered in this zone, Bishop will be seeded as seed 11A, and seed 11B will be filled by a seed from Zone 10.

Zone 12
December 9–11 at the Elmira & District Curling Club, Elmira

 Suzanne Frick (Guelph Curling) 
 Karen Sagle (Guelph Curling)
 Sheri Smeltzer (Fergus) (Zone 14A Qualifier)
 Anne Dunn (Galt Country) (Zone 14B Qualifier)
 Tracey Jones (Arthur)
 Courtney Hodgson (Guelph Curling)
 Janet McGhee (Guelph Curling)
 Kathy Ryan (K–W Granite)

Zone 13
December 17–18 at the Hamilton Victoria Club, Hamilton

 Katie Lindsay (Welland)
 Chrissy Cadorin (Glendale)
 Lorna Howarth (Hamilton Victoria)
 Sharon Lederman (Hamilton Victoria)
 Michelle Fletcher (Burlington Curling)

Zone 14
December 16–18 at the Harriston Curling Club, Harriston

As there were no teams entered in this zone, seeds 14A and 14B will be filled by seeds from Zone 12.

Zone 15
December 18 at the Woodstock Curling Club, Woodstock

 Allison Nimik (St. Thomas)
 Dianne Dykstra (Brant)
 Heather Carr Olmstead (St. Thomas)

Zone 16
December 10 at the Chatham Granite Club, Chatham

 Lisa Moore (Highland)
 Marika Bakewell (Highland)
 Katie Lambert (Ilderton)

Regions 1 & 2
January 6–8, Gananoque Curling Club, Gananoque

Regions 3 & 4
January 6–8, Penetanguishene Curling Club, Penetanguishene

Challenge Round
January 13–15, Oshawa Curling Club, Oshawa

Northern Ontario Provincials
The Northern Ontario provincials were held from December 8 to 11, 2011, at the Copper Cliff Curling Club in Copper Cliff, Ontario. The top four teams advanced to the provincial playoffs.

Teams

Standings

Results

Draw 1
December 9, 10:30 AM ET

Draw 2
December 9, 3:00 PM ET

Draw 3
December 9, 7:30 PM ET

Draw 4
December 10, 9:30 AM ET

Draw 5
December 10, 2:30 PM ET

Draw 6
December 10, 7:30 PM ET

Draw 7
December 11, 9:00 AM ET

References

Ontario
Scotties Tournament of Hearts
Ontario Scotties Tournament of Hearts
Sport in Kenora
Ontario Scotties Tournament of Hearts